is a Japanese YouTube personality who had worked for Uuum Co. His channel has over 5 million subscribers and has been awarded with the Silver and Gold YouTube Play Button. The origin of its name is due to his two favorite foods, sushi and ramen.

Riku's videos generally feature contrived practical stunts and experiments, often conceived supposedly to aid everyday convenience, such as building a rig to take off his pants using pressurized air or to break world records such as using a massive rubberband slingshot to catapult him while riding an office chair. Riku also films his occasional pranks on family members.

He started making videos for YouTube in junior high school, where he was part of a group called "Sushi Ramen" with some classmates. After graduating, he attended to a different high school from his classmates and then he started working alone, although keeping the same name. Even after graduating, Riku and his friends were prohibited from broadcasting videos showing their respective schools, which led to the pixilation of several of their videos. He opened his main channel, Sushi Ramen Riku, on 23 October 2013, where he makes mostly experimental videos. On 21 May 2015, he opened a subchannel called Sushi Ramen 2nd.

References

External links 
 Twitter 
 YouTube Channel

1999 births
21st-century Japanese artists
Comedy YouTubers
Living people
Japanese YouTubers